Georgios Ath. Souflias (born July 7, 1941) is a Greek politician. He is a member of the New Democracy political party and was Minister for the Environment, Physical Planning and Public Works for the duration of the Karamanlis administration.

Born in Farsala, Larissa regional unit to a family of Sarakatsani, he graduated in civil engineering from the National Technical University of Athens and he successfully exercised the profession in Larisa from 1966 to 1974. In each election from 1974 to 1996, he was elected as a member of the Greek Parliament from Larissa. He was Deputy Minister for Interior Affairs from November 1977 to May 1980 and Deputy Minister for Coordination from May 1980 to September 1981. From July 1989 to October 1989, was Minister for the National Economy, and from November 1989 to February 1990, he was Minister for Finance. He served as Minister for the National Economy again from April 1990 to October 1990; he was also Minister for Tourism from April 1990 to May 1990, and from January 1991 to October 1993 he was Minister for National Education and Religious Affairs. He was a candidate for the presidency of New Democracy in 1997, but the presidency was won by Kostas Karamanlis. On February 4, 1998, he was expelled from the party, along with two other members of parliament, for failing to vote along with the party in its opposition to a government policy. He did not run in the 2000 parliamentary election. On the first day of the party's 5th Congress, March 30, 2001, Karamanlis publicly invited Souflias to return to the party, describing the decision to expel him as "painful" and saying that it was made at a "politically charged time". Souflias returned on the last day of the congress, April 1.

Souflias subsequently became policy planning director of New Democracy while it was in opposition. He was injured, along with his wife, in a car crash on November 29, 2003, and two of his ribs were broken. He was released from the hospital on December 24.

He was elected in the 2004 parliamentary election as a deputy at large for New Democracy. Following this election he became Minister for the Environment, Physical Planning and Public Works in the government of Prime Minister Kostas Karamanlis on March 10, 2004.

In May 1993, he was nominated emeritus professor of human studies of the Greek College of Boston, United States. He is married to Marianna Koraka and he has two daughters, Olga and Ioanna.

References

1941 births
Living people
National Technical University of Athens alumni
Greek MPs 1974–1977
Greek MPs 1977–1981
Greek MPs 1981–1985
Greek MPs 1985–1989
Greek MPs 1989 (June–November)
Greek MPs 1989–1990
Greek MPs 1990–1993
Greek MPs 1993–1996
Greek MPs 1996–2000
Greek MPs 2004–2007
Greek MPs 2007–2009
MPs of Larissa
Ministers of National Education and Religious Affairs of Greece
Finance ministers of Greece
Sarakatsani
People from Farsala